Nabil Madi (born 9 June 1981) is an Algerian middle distance runner who specializes in the 800 metres.

He finished fourth at the 2006 African Championships. He also competed at the 2004 Olympic Games and the 2007 World Championships without reaching the final.

His personal best time is 1:44.54 minutes, achieved in July 2007 in Heusden-Zolder. In the 1500 metres he has 3:34.74 minutes, achieved in June 2008 in Rabat.

Nabil Madi is now athletics coach in Algeria working with middle-distance runner Slimane Moula.

External links

1981 births
Living people
Algerian male middle-distance runners
Athletes (track and field) at the 2004 Summer Olympics
Athletes (track and field) at the 2008 Summer Olympics
Olympic athletes of Algeria
21st-century Algerian people
20th-century Algerian people